is a Japanese international rugby union player who plays in the hooker position.   He currently plays for the Toshiba Brave Lupus in Japan's domestic Top League.

Early / Provincial Career

Mori has played all of his senior club rugby in Japan with the Toshiba Brave Lupus who he joined in 2011.

Super Rugby Career

Mori was selected as a member of the first ever Sunwolves squad ahead of the 2016 Super Rugby season.   He played 3 matches in their debut campaign.

International

Asahara has played 2 internationals for Japan, his debut coming against South Korea on April 30, 2016 and his second cap being earned against Hong Kong a week later.

Super Rugby Statistics

References

1988 births
Living people
Japanese rugby union players
Japan international rugby union players
Rugby union hookers
Toshiba Brave Lupus Tokyo players
Sunwolves players
People from Tokyo